Tash Farrash was a Turkic military officer of the Ghaznavid Empire in the mid-11th century. He is described as the chamberlain (hajib) of the Ghaznavid Sultan Mas'ud I. In 1031, he was appointed as the governor of Jibal by Mas'ud I. In 1033, Tash Farrash was sent on an expedition to Ray against the Turkmens, who had been causing disruption in the area; Tash Farrash managed to defeat the Turkmens and execute 50 of their chiefs, which included a prominent one named Yaghmur. However, Tash Farrash's tyranny towards the inhabitants of Jibal made Mas'ud I replace him with Abu Sahl Hamduwi as the governor of the region. Tash Farrash was later sent on another expedition against the Turkmens, but was defeated and killed by them sometime in the mid-1030s.

Sources 
 
 
 

1030s deaths
Year of birth unknown
11th-century Turkic people
Ghaznavid generals